Cross Internacional de la Constitución is an annual cross country running event which is held in early December in Alcobendas, Spain. The competition was first held in 1982 and began attracting top-level elite distance runners from the 1990s onwards. Hosted by the Club de Atletismo Popular de Alcobendas, the Cross de la Constitución takes place in Parque de Andalucia near the industrial centre in the city. Almost 600 runners took part in the races in 2010.

The men's elite competition is held over roughly 10 km, while the women elite runners compete over approximately 6 km. The exact race distances of the courses on the park's looped circuit vary from year to year, thus no course record is kept. The women's race was previously about 5 km but has been around 6 km since 1999. The race day's events include nine categories of competition: six are youth races by age group, short and long course races are held for senior athletes, and a separate veteran's race is also held for older runners.

Winners of the competition have included a number of World Cross Country champions: Zersenay Tadese, Joseph Ebuya, Gebregziabher Gebremariam and Albertina Dias have all gone on to win the world title after victory in Alcobendas. Other winners of note include Spanish marathon world champion Martín Fiz and track world champions Benjamin Limo, Vivian Cheruiyot and Linet Masai. The meet previously received permit status from European Athletics, the continental body for the sport.

Past senior race winners

Wins by country

References

List of winners
Civai, Franco (2010-12-07). Cross Internacional de la Constitucion. Association of Road Racing Statisticians. Retrieved on 2010-12-10.
Cuadro de vencedores del Cross Internacional de la Constitución . CAP-Alcobendas. Retrieved on 2010-12-10.

External links
Official club website

Cross country running competitions
Athletics competitions in Spain
Sport in the Community of Madrid
Recurring sporting events established in 1982
1982 establishments in Spain
Cross country running in Spain
Annual sporting events in Spain